St Margaret's Academy in Livingston, West Lothian, Scotland is a Catholic secondary school.

The school serves Broxburn, East Calder and the areas of Livingston: Eliburn, Deans, Howden, Craigshill, Dedridge, Ladywell, Livingston Village and Knightsridge.

History
St Margaret's Academy opened in 1994 as the successor to St Mary's Academy in Bathgate and Our Lady's High School, Broxburn.  In 1993 both schools, as two different entities, changed their name and uniform to Saint Margaret's.  The school is set in the Howden area of Livingston in a prominent site near the town centre.

The associated primary schools are St John Ogilvie Primary School in Deans, St Ninian's Primary in Dedridge and St Andrew's Primary in Craigshill, St Paul's Primary, East Calder, St Nicholas' Primary, Broxburn and Holy Family Primary in Winchburgh.

Weekend programmes 
The Scotland Japanese School (スコットランド日本語補習授業校 Sukottorando Nihongo Hoshū Jugyō Kō), a weekend Japanese school, is held at St. Margaret's. It first opened in 1982 and moved to Livingston in April 2003.

Notable alumni 

 Mark Burchill (born 1980), professional football player and coach
 Elise Christie (born 1990), short track speed skater

References

External links 
 

Educational institutions established in 1992
Catholic secondary schools in West Lothian
1994 establishments in Scotland
Educational institutions established in 1994